The second USS Comet (SP-772) was a United States Navy patrol vessel in commission during 1918.

Comet was built as a commercial motor fishing trawler of the same name in 1910 by E. W. Heath & Company at Tacoma, Washington. On 26 November 1917, the U.S. Navy acquired her from her owner, the San Juan Fishing & Packing Company of Seattle, Washington, for use as a section patrol vessel during World War I. She was commissioned as USS Comet (SP-772) on 15 February 1918.

Assigned to the 13th Naval District in the Pacific Northwest area of the United States, Comet served on naval duties for about the next six months.

In August 1918, the Commandant, 13th Naval District, received orders to return Comet to her owner. Accordingly, Comet was returned to San Juan Fishing & Packing on 23 August 1918.

Notes

References

Patrol vessels of the United States Navy
World War I patrol vessels of the United States
Ships built in Tacoma, Washington
1910 ships